Tonya Peterson Anderson (born July 16, 1969) is an American pastor and politician who serves in the Georgia State Senate. She previously served in the Georgia House of Representatives, from 2013 to 2015. She is a member of the Democratic Party.

Anderson was a candidate District 43 of the Georgia State Senate in the 2016 election. She advanced to a runoff election against Dee Dawkins-Haigler. Anderson led Dawkins-Haigler in the official vote count by 0.12 percent (4,276 votes to 4,266 votes), leading to Georgia Secretary of State Brian Kemp to order a recount. The recount confirmed Anderson's victory over Dawkins-Haigler by 10 votes.

Anderson defeated Republican incumbent Janice Frey Van Ness. The two women faced off prior in a December 2015 run- off, resulting in a very narrow win for Van Ness. Anderson was sworn into the State Senate on January 9, 2017.
Before serving in the legislature, Anderson served as the Mayor of Lithonia. Anderson has served in the Air Force Reserves. She also served as Chair of the Georgia Women's Legislative Caucus.

References

External links
 Profile at the Georgia State Senate
 
 Biography at Ballotpedia
 Profile at the Georgia General Assembly from the 2013-2014 Session

African-American female military personnel
African-American mayors in Georgia (U.S. state)
African-American state legislators in Georgia (U.S. state)
African-American women in politics
Living people
Mayors of places in Georgia (U.S. state)
Democratic Party members of the Georgia House of Representatives
People from Lithonia, Georgia
Female United States Air Force personnel
Women mayors of places in Georgia (U.S. state)
21st-century American politicians
21st-century American women politicians
African-American Christians
21st-century African-American women
21st-century African-American politicians
1969 births
African-American United States Air Force personnel